The 1996 Tour de Suisse was the 60th edition of the Tour de Suisse cycle race and was held from 11 June to 20 June 1996. The race started in Wil and finished in Zürich. The race was won by Peter Luttenberger of the Carrera team.

General classification

References

1996
Tour de Suisse